Vladimir Feldman (born 13 September 1959 in Zhytomyr) is an Australian chess International Master and trainer.

Feldman won the City of Sydney Chess Championship in 1993 and 1994, and the New South Wales Chess Championship in 1995.

In 1999, Feldman won the inaugural Oceania Zonal Chess Championship, held on the Gold Coast, Australia. As a result, he was awarded the title of International Master (IM) and qualified to play in the FIDE World Chess Championship 1999. In this competition he was eliminated in round 1 by Jordi Magem Badals from Spain.

Feldman represented Australia in the 2008 World Mind Sports Games in Beijing, China. He played for team Canberra in the 2012 World Cities Chess Championship in Al Ain, UAE.

Feldman has a master's degree in Chess Coaching from the State Institute of Physical Culture, Moscow, and is the co-owner of "Chess Masters", a chess coaching business in Sydney, with his wife, IM Irina Berezina. In 2005, he was awarded the FIDE Trainer title.

References

External links

Vladimir Feldman chess games at 365Chess.com

Chess Masters

1959 births
Living people
Chess International Masters
Australian chess players
Australian people of Ukrainian-Jewish descent
Jewish Australian sportspeople
Jewish chess players
Sportspeople from Zhytomyr
Soviet emigrants to Australia
Soviet Jews